Emergency Squad may refer to:

 Emergency medical services
 Emergency Squad (1940 film), an American adventure film
 Emergency Squad (1974 film), an Italian poliziottesco film
 Emergency SQUAD (2020 hip-hop group)